John Barney (January 18, 1785 – January 26, 1857) was a U.S. Congressman from the fifth district of Maryland, serving from 1825 to 1829. He was the son of Commodore Joshua Barney, a hero of the Revolution and the War of 1812.

Born in Baltimore, Maryland, Barney was appointed a captain and assistant district quartermaster general in the United States Army on August 15, 1814, and served until June 15, 1815, when he was honorably discharged.  He was an unsuccessful candidate for election in 1822 to the Eighteenth Congress, but was elected to the Nineteenth and Twentieth Congresses, serving from March 4, 1825, to March 3, 1829.  He was an unsuccessful candidate for re-election in 1828 to the Twenty-first Congress, and engaged in literary pursuits until his death in Washington, D.C.  He is interred in Green Mount Cemetery in Baltimore.

References

1785 births
1857 deaths
United States Army officers
American Presbyterians
National Republican Party members of the United States House of Representatives from Maryland
19th-century American politicians